Jesús Rodríguez Magro (28 May 1960 – 19 September 2018) was a Spanish racing cyclist. He rode in nineteen Grand Tours between 1982 and 1992.

Major results

1979
 2nd Overall Vuelta a Navarra
1980
 9th Gran Premio della Liberazione
1982
 2nd Clásica de San Sebastián
1983
 3rd Subida al Naranco
 10th Clásica de San Sebastián
1984
 2nd Klasika Primavera
1985
 1st Stage 2 Vuelta a Asturias
 1st Stage 4 Vuelta a Burgos
 1st Stage 4b Vuelta a los Valles Mineros
 2nd Overall Vuelta a Cantabria
1986
 1st Overall Vuelta a Asturias
1988
 2nd Clásica a los Puertos
1989
 5th Clásica de San Sebastián
1990
 8th Clásica de San Sebastián
 9th Overall Tour of Galicia
1993
 7th Subida a Urkiola

Grand Tour general classification results timeline

References

External links

1960 births
2018 deaths
Spanish male cyclists
Cyclists from Madrid